Solace, from Old French solas, from Latin sōlācium "consolation", meaning comfort or consolation in a time of distress.

Solace may also refer to:

Films
 Solace (2006 film), a South Korean romantic drama
 Solace (2015 film), an American mystery thriller
 Quantum of Solace, a James Bond film named after the Ian Fleming short story, released in October 2008

Music
 Solace (band), a heavy metal band from New Jersey, USA
 Solace (Joplin), a 1909 habanera by Scott Joplin

Albums
 Solace (Ion Dissonance album), a 2005 music album by Canadian metal band Ion Dissonance
 Solace (Jakob album), a 2006 music album by Jakob
 Solace (Lengsel album), a 2000 music album by the Norwegian metal band Lengsel
 Solace (Sarah McLachlan album), a 1991 music album by Sarah McLachlan
 Solace (Xavier Rudd album), a 2004 music album by Xavier Rudd
 Solace (Earl Sweatshirt EP), a 2015 extended play by Earl Sweatshirt
 Solace (Rüfüs Du Sol album), a 2018 album by Rüfüs Du Sol

Songs
"Solace", single by Play Dead with "Isabel", 1984
"Solace", song by Enya from Dark Sky Island
"Solace", song by Imelda May from 11 Past the Hour
"Solace", by The Sea Urchins, 1988

Other uses
The UK Society of Local Authority Chief Executives and Senior Managers is known as 'Solace'
 The USS Solace (AH-2), (AH-5) was the name of two United States Navy hospital ships. 
 Solace Corporation (formerly Solace Systems), a company based in Kanata, Ontario, Canada that manufactures and sells messaging routers.
 "Quantum of Solace", a James Bond short story by Ian Fleming. Part of the For Your Eyes Only collection